Coleotechnites eryngiella is a moth of the family Gelechiidae. It is found in North America, where it has been recorded from Alabama, Florida, Illinois, Indiana, Louisiana, Mississippi, Texas and Wisconsin.

The wingspan is about 15 mm. Adults have been recorded on wing from early April to September, suggesting at least two and possibly multiple generations per year.

The larvae feed on Eryngium aquaticum and Eryngium yuccifolium. They bore tunnels into the ovaries and developing mericarps of the flowers of their host plant. The larvae are pink and white-striped.

References

Moths described in 1926
Coleotechnites